Dingelstädt is a town in the district of Eichsfeld in Thuringia, Germany. The former municipalities Helmsdorf, Kefferhausen, Kreuzebra and Silberhausen were merged into Dingelstädt in January 2019. In January 2023 Dingelstädt absorbed the villages Bickenriede and Zella from the former municipality Anrode, and Beberstedt and Hüpstedt from the former municipality Dünwald.

Museums 

The Borderland Museum Eichsfeld is a history museum a few miles away from Dingelstädt which deals with the German division and the GDR. Its grounds also include a hiking trail along the former Iron Curtain.

People 

 Christian Joseph Jagemann (1735–1804), scholar, court counselor and librarian
 Anton Thraen, (1843–1902), the German astronomer, minister and native of Holungen died in Dingelstädt
 Michael Robert Rhein (*1964), lead singer of the medieval rock band In Extremo.

International relations 

Dingelstädt is twinned with:

  Jarosław in Poland (since 2001) 
  Felsberg in Germany
  Wenden in Germany

References 

Eichsfeld (district)